Softball is a sport that was formerly contested at the Summer Olympic Games.  On December 8, 1989, the International Olympic Committee (IOC) declined to stage a softball tournament as a demonstration sport in the 1992 Summer Olympics. At the 97th IOC session in 1991, the sport was granted official status as a medal sport for the 1996 Atlanta Olympics. Softball was contested at each subsequent Games through 2008, after which the IOC removed it from the Olympic program.

Entering the first Olympic softball tournament in 1996, the United States were the favorites, having won every international competition in which they participated for the prior ten years.  The United States team lived up to expectations by winning the gold medal. The Americans lost one game in the tournament, outscoring their opponents by a combined 41 runs to 8.  The Chinese team won their only Olympic medal in softball, a silver, in 1996.  In the 2000 tournament, the United States won their second consecutive gold medal, although they lost three games in the preliminary round at the Sydney Games.  At the 2004 Summer Olympics, the United States earned their third consecutive gold medal, winning all nine games and only allowing one run the entire tournament.

In 2004, the IOC investigated the addition of sports to the Olympic schedule including golf, rugby sevens, squash, roller sports and karate. The IOC voted on July 8, 2005, to remove softball and baseball from the 2012 Summer Olympics roster, the first sports removed from the Olympics since polo in 1936.  Appeals to reinstate both sports for 2012 were rejected. Softball was still played at the 2008 Summer Olympics in Beijing, however, and the Japanese team claimed their first gold and third overall medal in Olympic softball. The United States won silver, and the Australian team bronze, to become the only countries to win a medal in all four Olympic softball tournaments. The international governing bodies of softball, baseball, rugby sevens, golf, karate, roller sports, and squash petitioned the IOC in 2009 to fill two sport slots at the 2016 Olympics. IOC President Jacques Rogge said they were "looking for an added value – wide appeal, especially for young people." Ultimately the IOC voted to fill the two available slots for 2016 with rugby and golf.

Five nations won medals in softball at the Olympics; the United States, China, Australia, Japan, and Canada.  With three gold medals and two silver, the United States were the most successful team.  American center fielder Laura Berg was the only player to be a part of all four of those teams. Three Australian players also won four medals: one silver and three bronze.  Ten athletes won three medals, while thirty more won two medals.

Medal winners

Athlete medal leaders
Athletes who won at least two gold medals or three total medals are listed below.

See also
Softball at the Summer Olympics
Women's Softball World Cup
Softball at the World Games

References

General

Specific

medalists in softball

Lists of sportswomen
Softball